Monika Migała (born 1 May 1987, in Zgierz) is a Polish handball player. She plays for the club KPR Ruch Chorzów, the Polish national team and represented Poland at the 2013 World Women's Handball Championship in Serbia.

References

External links
Player profile at the Polish Handball Association website 

Polish female handball players
1987 births
Living people
People from Zgierz
Sportspeople from Łódź Voivodeship
21st-century Polish women